Zubarevo is a rural locality (a village) in Vysokovskoye Rural Settlement, Ust-Kubinsky  District, Vologda Oblast, Russia. The population was 4 as of 2002.

Geography 
Zubarevo is located 22 km southeast of Ustye (the district's administrative centre) by road. Sergeyevskoye is the nearest rural locality.

References 

Rural localities in Tarnogsky District